The Northwestern Wildcats softball team is an NCAA Division I college softball team and part of the Big Ten Conference.  They play their home games at Sharon J. Drysdale Field in Evanston, Illinois.  They have an overall record of 836-629-4.

History
The program was founded in 1976, posting a 1-6 record, and was coached by Mary Conway.  Conway coached for 3 years until Sharon J. Drysdale took the helm in 1979.  
Drysdale arrived at Northwestern in 1979 and spent the next 23 season building a program that would see 14 winning seasons under her tutelage.  By 1984, Drysdale had taken a program still in its infancy and earned a berth to the NCAA championships.  They finished a then-program-best third that season, setting a Women's College World Series benchmark that no Big Ten team would surpass for two decades.
She would return to the Women's College World Series two more times in her career, adding a fifth-place finish in 1985 and sixth-place finish in 1986.  Drysdale's 'Cats also reached regional playoffs two times- 1987 and 2000.
Named Big Ten Coach of the Year three teams (1984, 1987, and 1995), Drysdale reached many personal milestones in the latter portion of her career.  She hit the 500-victory mark in a 4-0 win over Loyola-Chicago on April 10, 1996.  And in her final year at the helm she picked up win 700 in a 4-2 decision over Indiana.
However, Drysdale says the honors and awards earned by her players mean more to her than her own.  There were five All-Americans, two Big Ten Players of the Year, four Big Ten Freshman of the Year, 31 NFCA All-Mideast Region players, and 36 All-Big Ten honorees.  Her tenure also included one of the most decorated pitchers in collegiate softball.  Lisa Ishikawa was a three-time All-American and during her freshman year she shattered the NCAA mark for strikeouts in a single season with 469.  That year alone, she was named Big Ten Female Athlete of the Year, Big Ten Player of the Year, Big Ten Pitcher Year, and Big  Ten Freshman of the Year.  Off the field, Drysdale was actively involved in NCAA softball rules interpretation.  She chaired the NCAA rules committee and was a member of the NFCA Bylaws committee.

Current team

In 2002, Kate Drohan, former assistant coach under Sharon Drysdale, assumed head coaching duties.  Drohan brought on board associate head coach, and twin sister, Caryl Drohan.  After 11 seasons as Northwestern's head coach, Kate Drohan's Wildcats have two Big Ten Titles, two Women's College World Series appearances (including one National Championship appearance), eight NCAA playoff appearances, 14 All-America nods, four Big Ten Freshman of the Year awards, five Big Ten Player of the Year awards, and three Big Ten Pitcher of the Year accolades.  Her 2006 coaching staff- including Caryl Drohan, Tori Nyberg, and Amanda Rivera- was the Speedline/National Fastpitch Coaches Association Coaching Staff of the Year.

Field
On May 3, 2001, Anderson Field was renamed Sharon J. Drysdale Field in honor of her 23-year commitment as the Wildcats' head coach.  For 1,155 games, Drysdale headed the Northwestern softball program and amassed a 640-512-3 record while sending 5 squads to the NCAA Tournament.  Drysdale left Northwestern after the 2001 season to pursue a coaching certification program with the National Fastpitch Coaches Association (NFCA), but her legacy continues to live on at Northwestern.  As of Fall 2007, the field is undergoing renovations that will see a new and improved bleacher seating area as well as an enclosed press box to replace the press tent of the past.

Wildcat honors

National Awards
NFCA National Freshman of the Year
 2019 Danielle Williams

Softball America Freshman of the Year
 2019 Danielle Williams

Conference awards
Big Ten Distinguished Scholar-Athletes
2010  Robin Thompson
2011  Kelly Quinn
2012  Marisa Bast
2013  Marisa Bast, Julia Kuhn, Amanda Mehrsheikh, Kristin Scharkey
2014  Sammy Albanese, Marisa Bast, Andrea DiPrima, Julia Kuhn, Paige Tonz

Big Ten Pitcher of the Year
1984 Lisa Ishikawa
2006 Eileen Canney
2007 Eileen Canney
2008 Lauren Delaney
2022 Danielle Williams

Big Ten Player of the Year
1984 Lisa Ishikawa
1985 Lisa Ishikawa
2000 Brooke Siebel
2005 Garland Cooper
2006 Garland Cooper
2007 Garland Cooper
2008 Tammy Williams
2009 Tammy Williams
2022 Rachel Lewis 

Big Ten Freshman of the Year
1984 Lisa Ishikawa
1986 Ndidi Opia
1987 Chinazo Opia
1998 Brooke Siebel
2004 Eileen Canney
2006 Tammy Williams
2007 Nicole Pauly
2009 Adrienne Monka
2019 Danielle Williams

All-Americans
1982 Sue Hebson (2nd)
1984 Lisa Ishikawa
1985 Lisa Ishikawa
1987 Lisa Ishikawa (2nd)
1993 Anne Carpenter (3rd)
2005 Garland Cooper, Stephanie Churchwell (2nd), Courtnay Foster (3rd)
2006 Eileen Canney (2nd), Garland Cooper (3rd), Tammy Williams (3rd)
2007 Eileen Canney (2nd), Garland Cooper (3rd), Tammy Williams
2008 Tammy Williams
2009 Adrienne Monka, Tammy Williams
2011 Adrienne Monka
2012 Marisa Bast (3rd)
2018 Rachel Lewis (2nd)
2019 Danielle Williams (3rd)

CoSIDA Academic All-District V
1989  Chinazo Opia
1990  Kim Metcalf, Chinazo Opia
2002  Lauren Schwendimann (2nd)
2003  Erin Mobley
2004  Carri Leto
2005  Garland Cooper, Erin Mobley
2006  Kristen Amegin, Garland Cooper
2007  Garland Cooper
2009  Kelly Quinn (2nd)
2010  Nicole Pauly (2nd)
2011  Robin Thompson
2013  Marisa Bast
2014  Marisa Bast

CoSIDA Academic All-America
1985  Karen Lemke (HM)
1989  Chinazo Opia (3rd)
1990  Chinazo Opia, Kim Metcalf (3rd)
2006  Garland Cooper (3rd)
2007  Garland Cooper
2011  Robin Thompson (3rd)
2013  Marisa Bast (2nd)
2014  Marisa Bast (2nd)

NFCA All-America Scholar-Athletes
1994  Angela Alessandrini, Shannon Norton
1995  Angela Alessandrini, Jennifer Coon, Susan Hofbauer
1996  Katie Ballman, Peggy Mandel, Erin Robson
1997  Katie Ballman, Lauri Gillis, Tricia Kay, Erin Robson
1998  Stacy Austin, Kathryn Breneman
1999  Jenni Beseres
2012  Sammy Albanese, Marisa Bast, Amanda Mehrsheikh, Kristin Scharkey
2013  Sammy Albanese, Emily Allard, Marisa Bast, Julia Kuhn, Mari Majam, Amanda Mehrsheikh, Kristin Scharkey, Paige Tonz, Lauren Tyndall

Women's College World Series All-Tournament Team
1984 Lisa Ishikawa
2006 Eileen Canney, Garland Cooper, Tammy Williams
2007 Tammy Williams

Wildcats in National Professional Fastpitch
  Carri Leto - in 2004, Leto became the first NU female student-athlete to be drafted by a professional franchise.  Leto began her professional career with the N.Y./N.J. Juggernaut of National Professional Fastpitch (NPF) and then moved to the Philadelphia Force after two seasons.  She is a three-time NPF All-Star and was the named the league's Defensive Player of the Year in 2006.  She also played for the New England Riptide.
  Caryl Drohan  - current Northwestern Associate Head Coach was an assistant for the Philadelphia Force in 2006.  In 2007, she served as an assistant coach for the Chicago Bandits.
  Courtnay Foster - in 2006, Foster was drafted in the NPF, but elected not to play.
  Eileen Canney - in the 2007 draft, Canney was the second overall pick and the first pitcher selected.  She played for the New England Riptide.
  Garland Cooper - was the fourth overall pick in the 2007 draft.  She joined teammates Eileen Canney and Carri Leto on the New England Riptide which was coached by legendary former NU coach, Sharon Drysdale.
  Tammy Williams - Drafted 10th overall in the 2009 Draft by the Chicago Bandits.
  Nicole Pauly -
  Robin Thompson -
  Adrienne Monka -
  Emily Allard

Source of information
2007 Northwestern Softball Media Guide

See also
 Northwestern Wildcats
 2007 Women's College World Series
List of NCAA Division I softball programs

References

External links

 Northwestern Softball
 Northwestern University
 Big Ten
 National Fastpitch Coaches Association